Edward Thomas Bullmore,  (born 27 September 1960) is a British Neuropsychiatrist, neuroscientist and academic. Since 1999, he has been Professor of Psychiatry at the University of Cambridge. In 2005, he also became Vice-President of Experimental Medicine at GlaxoSmithKline while maintaining his post at University of Cambridge.

Early life
Bullmore was born on 27 September 1960 to Jeremy Bullmore and Pamela Bullmore (née Green). He was educated at Westminster School, a public school in the grounds of Westminster Abbey, London. He studied clinical medicine at Christ Church, Oxford, and graduated from the University of Oxford with a Bachelor of Arts (BA) degree. He then continued his medical training at St Bartholomew's Hospital, London. He graduated from its Medical College with Bachelor of Medicine, Bachelor of Surgery (MB BS) degrees.

Career
Bullmore began his medical career as an academic rather than a physician. From 1987 to 1988, he was a lecturer in medicine at the University of Hong Kong. He then returned to England, where he began training in his chosen specialisation as a Senior House Officer in psychiatry at St George's Hospital, London. After a year, he moved hospitals, and was appointed a Registrar in psychiatry at Bethlem Royal Hospital and Maudsley Hospital; both specialist psychiatric hospitals in London.

In 1993, Bullmore began his research career. That year, he was appointed a Wellcome Trust Research Training Fellow and served in that role for three years. During that time he studied for a Doctor of Philosophy (PhD) degree at King's College London, which he completed in 1997 with a thesis titled "Analysis of structural and functional magnetic resonance images of the brain". In 1996, he was promoted to an Advanced Research Training Fellow for a further three years. His research during this time focused on the mathematical analysis of neurophysiological time series. From 1996 to 1999, he was additionally an honorary Consultant Psychiatrist at Maudsley Hospital, London.

In 1999, Bullmore joined the University of Cambridge as Professor of Psychiatry. At college level, he was an elected Fellow of Wolfson College, Cambridge between 2002 and 2010. On 9 October 2014, he was appointed Head of the Department of Psychiatry, University of Cambridge.

In 2005, he joined GlaxoSmithKline as Vice-President of Experimental Medicine. 

From 2005 to 2013, he was also Head of its Clinical Unit based in Addenbrooke's Hospital, Cambridge, Cambridgeshire, which focuses on early clinical drug development projects.

Honours
In 2008, Bullmore was elected a Fellow of the Academy of Medical Sciences (FMedSci). In 2009, he was elected a Fellow of the Royal College of Psychiatrists (FRCPsych). In 2010, he was elected a Fellow of the Royal College of Physicians (FRCP). He is also a Senior Investigator at the National Institute for Health Research (NIHR).

Selected works

References

External links 
 Professor Ed Bullmore at University of Cambridge, Cambridge Neuroscience
 
 Interview with Edward Bullmore on the 'Inflamed Mind' theory of depression, NOUS the podcast

1960 births
Living people
British psychiatrists
Academics of the University of Cambridge
GSK plc people
People educated at Westminster School, London
British neuroscientists
Alumni of Christ Church, Oxford
Alumni of the Medical College of St Bartholomew's Hospital
Academic staff of the University of Hong Kong
Fellows of Wolfson College, Cambridge
Fellows of the Royal College of Psychiatrists
Fellows of the Royal College of Physicians
Fellows of the Academy of Medical Sciences (United Kingdom)
NIHR Senior Investigators
Alumni of King's College London
Place of birth missing (living people)